The Professional Geographer is a quarterly peer-reviewed academic journal publishing short articles on all aspects of geography. The journal is published by Taylor and Francis on behalf of the American Association of Geographers. According to the Journal Citation Reports, the journal has a 2021 impact factor of 2.411, ranking it 46th out of 85 journals in the category "Geography".

Every year, the journal publishes a special section with papers that were finalists for the J. Warren Nystrom Award, given to the best paper based upon a recent dissertation in geography.

Abstracting and indexing 
The journal is abstracted and indexed in:

References

External links 
 

History of geography journals
Publications established in 1949
Routledge academic journals
English-language journals
Quarterly journals
American Association of Geographers
Academic journals associated with learned and professional societies of the United States